An acanthoma is a skin neoplasm composed of squamous or epidermal cells. It is located in the prickle cell layer.

Types of acanthoma include pilar sheath acanthoma, a benign follicular tumor usually of the upper lip; clear cell acanthoma, a benign tumor found most frequently on the legs; and Degos acanthoma, often confused with but unrelated to Degos disease.

History
In 2005, "Acanthoma" was added to MeSH as an index term;  previous indexing was "Skin Neoplasms" (1965–2004).  At that time, PubMed indexed only 206 articles with the term "acanthoma" (the term usually in the title or abstract).

References

External links 

Rare cancers